Massilia tieshanensis is a Gram-negative, non-spore-forming rod-shaped, motile bacterium from the genus Massilia and family Oxalobacteraceae, which was isolated from a metal mine soil in Tieshan District in central China. Colonies are straw-yellow.

References

External links
Type strain of Massilia tieshanensis at BacDive -  the Bacterial Diversity Metadatabase

Burkholderiales
Bacteria described in 2012